Hamstead Colliery in Hamstead (then Staffordshire, now West Midlands), England, produced coal between 1878 and 1965, by mining the South Staffordshire 'Thick' coal seam. It suffered a major fire in 1908 in which 26 men died.

History 

The Hamstead Colliery Company was formed in April 1875. It acquired land in an area of Staffordshire, on what is now the north west border of Birmingham, from G.C. Calthorpe of nearby Perry Hall, and in 1876 sank shafts. 

The first coal was not extracted until after 1878 due to unexpected geological problems and water ingress. The coal was at a very deep level of almost 2000 feet. It closed in 1898 due to a fire in the workings, throwing 800 men out of work. With the Midlands facing an acute coal shortage it reopened on 8 January 1900.

In 1928, due to boundary changes, the mine head area became part of West Bromwich. Shortly afterwards, the mine was acquired by the Hamstead Colliery (1930) Ltd.

After nationalisation on the first day of 1947, when it became part of the National Coal Board, it continued to produce coal profitably until 1965 when the mine closed and housing was built on the site of the pithead.

The pithead baths building, opened in 1937, was redeveloped as a nightclub. Kings. It has since been demolished, and as of 2023, the site is occupied by a petrol station.

1905 collapse 

A collapse of coal late on 25 October 1905 trapped two miners. They were released without injury by a rescue party the following day.

Mining disaster of 1908 
  
The disaster of 4 March 1908 was a national tragedy with 26 men killed in one day. When the fire broke out there were 31 miners in the pit, 6 escaped before poisonous fumes built up in the roadways. Rescue teams from Hamstead, Tankersley and Altofts in Yorkshire, made many attempts to reach the entombed men. It took a week after the fire for the mine to clear of the fumes. On 11 March, 14 bodies were recovered, and 6 more were recovered the following day. One of the victims was a member of the rescue team from Altofts, John Welsby. A memorial was created at Hamstead village in 2008 and there is a small museum display at the local library in the Tanhouse Centre, Great Barr.

Statistics 

In 1923, the mine's annual output was stated by the Colliery Year Book and Coal Trades Directory as being 165,000 tons. In 1933, it was given by the same source as 260,000 tons.

Railways 

The colliery had its own network of railway sidings, connected to the former Grand Junction Railway just north of Hamstead station.

A tramway connected the pithead to a basin (since filled in) on the nearby Tame Valley Canal.

World's deepest colliery 

At one point the mine was the deepest in the world. The experience gained by the mining engineers was put to good use in the English mining industry and their expertise was so world renown that the American Government requested assistance from the engineers that had solved many of Hamstead Colliery's problems, to establish deep coal mining in America, this enhancing the growing co-operation in science and technology between the two countries.

Brickworks 

A brickworks was operated next to the colliery, on the opposite side of Old Walsall Road and so (from 1929) just inside Birmingham, making bricks using clay dug out in the process of making new mine tunnels.

Legacy 

The Hamstead Miners Memorial Trust, a registered charity (number 1098711) exists to record and commemorate the mine and those who worked there. The trust erected, and maintains, a memorial on the junction of Hamstead Road and Old Walsall Road, near the former pithead. Erected in 2008, on the centenary of the disaster, it comprises a derailed tramway wagon full of coal, with a buffer-stop, and commemorative plaques.

Further reading

References

External links

 Hamstead Miners Memorial Trust

Coal mines in England
1876 establishments in England
History of the West Midlands (county)
West Bromwich